Enrico Lanzi (born 5 February 1953 in Spessa) is an Italian professional football coach and a former player, who played as a defender.

He played 4 seasons (33 games, no goals) in the Serie A for A.C. Milan, Varese F.C. and Perugia Calcio.

Despite playing just a few games for Milan, he managed to put his name in infamy in the club's history books, scoring an own goal in the 1974 European Cup Winners' Cup Final that Milan ended up losing 2–0 to 1. FC Magdeburg.

External links
Profile at magliarossonera.it 

1953 births
Living people
Italian footballers
Serie A players
Serie B players
Serie C players
A.C. Cesena players
A.C. Milan players
S.S.D. Varese Calcio players
A.C. Perugia Calcio players
A.C. Monza players
Italian football managers
Association football defenders